is a passenger railway station located in the city of Sagamihara, Kanagawa Prefecture, Japan, operated by the East Japan Railway Company (JR East).

Lines

Station layout
The station consists of a single island platform, connected to a modern station building by a footbridge. The station is staffed.

Platforms

History
It was renamed  in 1940. On June 1, 1944, the Sagami Railway was nationalized and merged with the Japanese Government Railways, at which time the station received its current name. On April 1, 1987, with the dissolution and privatization of the Japanese National Railways, the station came under the operation of JR East. Scheduled freight services were discontinued from 1996. Automated turnstiles using the Suica IC card system came into operation from November 2001. The station building was complexly rebuilt in 2006.

Passenger statistics
In fiscal 2019, the station was used by an average of 5,595 passengers daily (boarding passengers only).

The passenger figures (boarding passengers only) for previous years are as shown below.

Surrounding area
Kanagawa Medical Reform School
NEC Sagamihara Plant

Gallery

See also
List of railway stations in Japan

References

External links

JR East page for Minami-Hashimoto Station

Railway stations in Kanagawa Prefecture
Railway stations in Japan opened in 1941
Railway stations in Sagamihara
Sagami Line